Eric Joseph Lichaj (born November 17, 1988) is an American former professional soccer player, who is currently the head coach of the FC Cincinnati U19 team.

Club career
Eric Lichaj is the third son of Stan and Ann Lichaj, who were both from Nowy Targ, Poland. He has two older brothers, Andrew and Mark Lichaj. At the age of 14, Lichaj joined the soccer residency program at IMG Academy in Bradenton, Florida. He began his youth career with the Downers Grove Roadrunners, later played with Chicago Fire's youth side, and then spent one year at the University of North Carolina. He also played four games for the Chicago Fire Premier of the USL Premier Development League. After his freshman season, Lichaj signed with English Premier League club Aston Villa. Lichaj holds a Polish passport, making a work permit unnecessary.

Aston Villa
Following a season in the Aston Villa youth side, Lichaj featured in all but two of Villa's Reserve matches during the 2008–09 season. During the 2009–10 pre-season, he was selected for the 2009 Peace Cup squad and showed glimpses of his potential during the friendly tournament. This, however, did not immediately translate into playing time for the first team.

Lichaj was loaned out to League Two club Lincoln City to gain first-team experience. He played two games for Lincoln before signing a one-month loan extension. Later in the season, Lichaj again went on a month-long loan, this time to League One side Leyton Orient. He scored the first professional goal of his career for Leyton Orient against Stockport County on April 17, 2010.

Lichaj scored his first goal for Aston Villa on July 19, 2010, in a pre-season friendly against Peterborough United. Following a successful pre-season campaign, he signed a new three-year contract with the club on August 11, 2010. He made his competitive debut for Villa on August 19, 2010, in a 1–1 draw in a Europa League qualifying match away to Rapid Vienna. He made his Premier League debut for Aston Villa on November 10, 2010, against Blackpool. Lichaj made his first start for Aston Villa on December 11, 2010, in a 2–1 win against local rivals West Bromwich Albion. He also started for Villa at right back against Tottenham Hotspur, where he put in an impressive performance against in-form Spurs winger Gareth Bale.

Leeds United (loan)
On February 9, 2011, Lichaj joined Leeds United on a one-month loan deal. Lichaj made his Leeds debut in a 2–0 victory against Bristol City. On March 14, Leeds extended Lichaj's loan for the rest of the season. He scored an own goal in Leeds' match against Yorkshire rivals Sheffield United, who went on to win the match 2–0. After playing all of his games at right back in place of the injured Paul Connolly, Lichaj was moved to left back when George McCartney was injured. On May 9, Lichaj played the last game of his Leeds United loan spell in Leeds' 2–1 win over Queens Park Rangers. Leeds announced on their official website that Lichaj would be returning to his parent club Aston Villa at the end of his loan spell. After his loan expired, Lichaj said he wanted to rejoin Leeds the following season to help them earn promotion to the Premier League.

Back at Villa
After impressing during his loan spell, in July 2011 Leeds manager Simon Grayson said he was interested in re-signing Lichaj on loan as long as new Aston Villa manager Alex McLeish did not plan to use Lichaj in his first team. Lichaj scored his first goal for Aston Villa in their 2–0 win over Hereford United in the League Cup on August 23, 2011. On March 31, 2012, having already assisted Villa's first goal by throwing the ball long for James Collins to score from a header, Lichaj scored his first Premier League goal in a 4–2 defeat at home to Chelsea. After the 2012–13 Premier League season, Aston Villa decided not to renew Lichaj's contract, releasing him on a free transfer.

Nottingham Forest
Lichaj signed a two-year contract with Championship club Nottingham Forest on June 19, 2013. He made his debut in a 1–0 win against Huddersfield Town on the opening day of the season. In December 2014, he extended his deal until the summer of 2017. On October 20, 2015, Lichaj scored his first Nottingham Forest goal in a 1–1 draw with Burnley at the City Ground. Lichaj captained Forest for the first time on September 27, 2016, for a home game against Fulham and scored his second goal for the club in his next home game, opening the scoring in a 3–1 win over Birmingham City.

Following the sale of Henri Lansbury in January 2017 and the continued absence of regular captains such as Chris Cohen and Matt Mills, Lichaj continued to captain the side. He told local newspaper Nottingham Post he took "great pride" in the captaincy and that he had retained the armband from his first match as captain. At the end of the 2016–17 season, the club's fans named Lichaj Forest's Player of the Year, receiving over 40% of the vote.

In the third round of the 2017–18 FA Cup, Lichaj scored two goals in a 4–2 win over Arsenal, knocking the cup holders out of the competition. After the match, Lichaj stated his wife had promised to give him a dog if he scored a hat-trick in 2018.

Hull City
On June 22, 2018, Lichaj signed a two-year deal with Hull City for an undisclosed fee.
He made his debut in the first match of the 2018–19 season on August 6, 2018 at home to Aston Villa in a 1–3 defeat. He was released by the team in 2020.

International career 
Lichaj has been involved with various U.S. youth teams. He helped the U.S. qualify for the 2005 FIFA U-17 World Championship and was named in the United States U-20 squad for the 2007 FIFA U-20 World Cup, although he missed out due to injury. He was called into the senior team as a "guest" for the camp preceding two World Cup qualifiers in June 2009. Lichaj received his first call-up to the United States senior team in October 2010 and was included in the squad for the friendlies against Poland and Colombia. Lichaj collected his first cap on October 12, 2010, in the friendly against Colombia. On November 17, 2010, Lichaj gained his second cap when he started for the U.S. against South Africa. On March 21, 2011, Lichaj received a call-up to the U.S. national side for the games against Argentina and Paraguay. He was named in the U.S. 2011 Gold Cup squad; after sitting on the bench for the first two Gold Cup matches, Lichaj played all 90 minutes of the last four, including the 4–2 loss in the final against Mexico.

In 2013, Lichaj returned to international duty after a two-year absence, making two substitute appearances for the U.S. against Scotland and Austria in November. In May 2016, Lichaj was again recalled by the U.S., as part of the preliminary Copa América Centenario roster, and for a friendly match against Puerto Rico, in which he appeared as a substitute.

During a 2017 Gold Cup quarterfinal match against El Salvador on July 19, 2017, Lichaj scored his first international goal to help the United States win 2–0.

Career statistics

Club

International

International goals
Scores and results list the United States' goal tally first.

Honors
United States
CONCACAF Gold Cup: 2017

References

External links

Profile at Aston Villa F.C. website

1988 births
Living people
People from Downers Grove, Illinois
American soccer players
American people of Polish descent
Soccer players from Illinois
Sportspeople from DuPage County, Illinois
Association football defenders
North Carolina Tar Heels men's soccer players
American expatriate soccer players
Chicago Fire U-23 players
Aston Villa F.C. players
Lincoln City F.C. players
Leyton Orient F.C. players
Leeds United F.C. players
Nottingham Forest F.C. players
Hull City A.F.C. players
Fatih Karagümrük S.K. footballers
USL League Two players
English Football League players
Premier League players
Süper Lig players
United States men's youth international soccer players
United States men's under-20 international soccer players
United States men's international soccer players
2011 CONCACAF Gold Cup players
2017 CONCACAF Gold Cup players
Expatriate footballers in England
Expatriate footballers in Turkey
American expatriate sportspeople in England
American expatriate sportspeople in Turkey
CONCACAF Gold Cup-winning players
FC Cincinnati non-playing staff